Low Water-Mark Mandatory Access Control (LOMAC) is a Mandatory Access Control model which protects the integrity of system objects and subjects by means of an information flow policy coupled with the subject demotion via floating labels.  In LOMAC, all system subjects and objects are assigned integrity labels, made up of one or more hierarchical grades, depending on their types.  Together, these label elements permit all labels to be placed in a partial order, with information flow protections and demotion decisions based on a dominance operator describing the order.

Implementations 
 In FreeBSD, the Biba model is implemented by the mac_lomac MAC policy.
 In Linux, there is a project that attempts to implement LOMAC policy.

See also 
 Multi-Level Security - MLS
 Mandatory Access Control - MAC
 Discretionary Access Control - DAC
 Take-Grant Model
 The Clark-Wilson Integrity Model
 Graham-Denning Model
 Security Modes of Operation

References

 Security Engineering, Ross Anderson

External links
 The LOMAC project
 

Computer security models
Computer access control